1709 Ukraina, provisional designation , is a stony asteroid from the inner regions of the asteroid belt, approximately 9 kilometers in diameter. It was discovered on 16 August 1925, by Soviet astronomer Grigory Shajn at Simeiz Observatory on the Crimean peninsula. It was named in honor of Ukraine.

Orbit and classification 

Ukraina orbits the Sun in the inner main-belt at a distance of 1.9–2.9 AU once every 3 years and 8 months (1,340 days). Its orbit has an eccentricity of 0.21 and an inclination of 8° with respect to the ecliptic.

The body's observation arc begins at Heidelberg, five days after its official discovery observation at Simeiz.

Physical characteristics 

The S-type asteroid has an albedo of about 0.2 and a rotation period of 7.3 hours.

Naming 

This minor planet was named after the country Ukraine, then the Ukrainian Soviet Socialist Republic (1922–1991). The name was proposed by the Institute of Theoretical Astronomy in Leningrad, what is now St. Petersburg. The official  was published by the Minor Planet Center on 1 June 1967.

References

External links 
 Asteroid Lightcurve Database (LCDB), query form (info )
 Dictionary of Minor Planet Names, Google books
 Asteroids and comets rotation curves, CdR – Observatoire de Genève, Raoul Behrend
 Discovery Circumstances: Numbered Minor Planets (1)-(5000) – Minor Planet Center
 
 

001709
Discoveries by Grigory Shajn
Named minor planets
19250816